Chanda Rubin was the defending champion, but was forced to withdraw due to a right shoulder tendonitis. However, she recovered in time to compete in the doubles tournament, losing in the first round.

Kim Clijsters won the title by defeating Lindsay Davenport 6–1, 3–6, 6–1 in the final. This victory allowed Clijsters to reach the World No. 1 ranking, ending the 57-week reign of Serena Williams.

Seeds
All seeds received a bye into the second round.

Draw

Finals

Top half

Section 1

Section 2

Bottom half

Section 3

Section 4

References

External links
 Official results archive (ITF)
 Official results archive (WTA)

2003 WTA Tour
LA Women's Tennis Championships